The 1948 LSU Tigers football team represented Louisiana State University (LSU) in the 1948 college football season.

Schedule

References

LSU
LSU Tigers football seasons
LSU Tigers football